The 1997 Paris Open was a men's tennis tournament played on indoor carpet courts. It was the 25th edition of the Paris Masters, and was part of the ATP Super 9 of the 1997 ATP Tour. It took place at the Palais omnisports de Paris-Bercy in Paris, France, from 27 October through 3 November 1997. First-seeded Pete Sampras won the singles title.

Finals

Singles

 Pete Sampras defeated  Jonas Björkman 6–3, 4–6, 6–3, 6–1
 It was Sampras' 7th singles title of the year and the 51st of his career. It was his 2nd Masters title of the year, and 9th overall.

Doubles

 Jacco Eltingh /  Paul Haarhuis defeated  Rick Leach /  Jonathan Stark 6–2, 7–6

References

External links
 ATP tournament profile